"Memories" is a song by American band Maroon 5, released through 222 and Interscope Records on September 20, 2019, as the lead single from the band's seventh studio album Jordi.

Lyrically, the song pays homage to the memories of a loved one who has since passed. The song divided critics, with many panning its production but others calling it "sweet". It was listed as one of the worst songs of 2019 by Spin magazine. "Memories" is based on "Canon in D Major" by German composer Johann Pachelbel. The song was written by Maroon 5's lead singer Adam Levine, Stefan Johnson, Jordan Johnson, Michael Pollack, Jacob Kasher Hindlin, Jon Bellion, and Vincent Ford. Levine and the production team the Monsters and the Strangerz produced the song. The single peaked at number two on the US Billboard Hot 100 chart and at number one on the international music charts.

It is Maroon 5's final single with bassist Mickey Madden, who announced his departure from the band in 2020, following his arrest for domestic violence.

Background and release
The band's lead singer, Adam Levine, explained: "This song is for anyone who has ever experienced loss. In other words, this song is for all of us." The song is based on the loss of the band's manager and Levine's friend, Jordan Feldstein who died in December 2017, from pulmonary embolism. According to guitarist, James Valentine: "It's a different kind of song for us…It's an important song for us. You know, we experienced some loss in the last couple of years. We lost our longtime manager, Jordan Feldstein. We heard the skeleton of this song and thought it matched where we were at."

In an interview of The Howard Stern Show, Levine said: "I needed this song", he continued: "In a world that's increasingly chaotic and crazy and angry in a lot of ways... rather than fight about things, it's nice to have a common ground and all of us have had loss... [It's about loss] and celebrate them too, which I think it's important".

"Memories" was released on September 20, 2019. Maroon 5 released four remixed versions of the song, featuring Dillon Francis on December 13, 2019, followed by Devault (December 16), Cut Copy (December 18), and a remix featuring American rappers Nipsey Hussle and YG (this remix is also included on the Jordi album, alongside the original version of "Memories"). A 7-inch vinyl single was released on Record Store Day (October 24, 2020), which includes the song, the Dillon Francis remix and a 20-page photo & lyric booklet.

Composition
"Memories" was written by Adam Levine, Stefan Johnson, Jordan Johnson, Michael Pollack, Jacob Kasher Hindlin, Jon Bellion and Vincent Ford, and produced by Levine and the Monsters and the Strangerz. The song is based on the harmonic sequence and melody of "Canon in D" by Johann Pachelbel. The song is in the key of B major, and Levine's vocals span from D#4 to the high note of G#5.

Critical reception
Critical response to "Memories" was polarising. Rolling Stone India listed it among the worst songs of 2019. In The Guardian, Graeme Virtue was critical of the track's "trite" lyrics, and dismissed it as "fun-free dreck". Pitchforks Dani Blum found the guitar line "cloying" and the take on tragedy "pallid". Evening Standard reviewer David Smyth called the song's use of "Canon in D Major" a "ghastly poaching". Jason Friedman of Paste derided it for being as "viscerally annoying" as the band's 2016 single "Don't Wanna Know". Spin listed "Memories" as one of the worst songs of 2019, describing it as "a replica of a replica of a replica, sticky with the residue of borrowed emotion but hollow of anything resembling its own".
 
In a more enthusiastic review, Jon Dolan of Rolling Stone viewed the song as "a sweet, somber, genuinely felt ballad". Similarly, El Hunt of NME called it a "sharp pop song" with "substance and heart". Maeve McDermott of USA Today felt the track is "primed for end-of-summer nostalgia" and compared Levine's vocals to Sting.

Chart performance
"Memories" debuted at number 22 on the Billboard Hot 100, and later peaked at number two behind Post Malone's "Circles" to become the band's 10th top-five track and 15th top-ten track. This made Maroon 5 only the second band (the other is the Rolling Stones) to have a top-two hit on the Hot 100 in three different decades (2000s, 2010s and 2020s). The song additionally peaked at number one on the Adult Top 40 chart, giving the band its fourteenth number one there, and at number one on the Adult Contemporary chart, where it remained for 20 weeks. At the end of 2020, "Memories" ranked at number eight on the Hot 100 year-end chart.

Music videos

Official video
The official music video was released on October 8, 2019, on YouTube. Directed by David Dobkin and shot by cinematographer Jeff Cronenweth, this video is reminiscent of Sinead O'Connor's music video for "Nothing Compares 2 U" (1990). The video shows Adam Levine close to the camera singing in front of a dark background. It ends with the words "For Jordi", which are a dedication to Feldstein.

Lyric videos
An animated lyric video of the song was released on November 29, 2019, by the band's YouTube channel. Directed by Andrew S. Cohen and Ryan Kieffer and was created by the animated production studio Confidential Cartoon Studios. The lyric video starts in an attic with the Maroon 5 memory box to include a number of items referencing the band's music videos for other songs: mural ("Three Little Birds"), Union Flag ("Moves Like Jagger" featuring Christina Aguilera and "One More Night"), the microphone ("Moves Like Jagger"), bow tie and toast glasses ("Sugar"), scorpion ("Wait"), black leather jacket ("Misery"), cherry blossom trees ("This Love"), blue turtle costume ("Don't Wanna Know" featuring Kendrick Lamar), the payphone ("Payphone" featuring Wiz Khalifa and "Wake Up Call"), white boxing gloves ("One More Night") and a red lollipop and butterfly ("What Lovers Do" featuring SZA), along with a collection of boxes. Scenes with the map of Los Angeles from the band's concerts and their tour bus. Other items in the video including an album cover art of the band's The Studio Albums (2016), The Voice drinking cup, Magic 8 Ball, electric guitar, two MTV awards features the Moon Man in Video Music Award and the trophy in Europe Music Award, a Grammy Award and iHeartRadio Music Award trophy, tickets and the letter M with a vertex logo from the band's coloured stickers, a leon lighted of "V" from the band's fifth album and a collage of photos from when the band was known as Kara's Flowers, all together only inside a collection of items appeared from the box.

Another lyric video, which is the song's remix version by musician Dillon Francis, was released on his YouTube channel on December 13, 2019. It features a montage of home videos and pictures showing Francis' friend Noel Teacher Mor, with her family including her sister Kelly Teacher and more recent videos such as Francis and Noel are heading to various concerts from Coachella to Las Vegas in the United States. This video is dedicated to Noel, who died of cancer on September 30, 2019.

A third lyric video with another remix featuring Nipsey Hussle and YG and was animated by Michelle Renslo, Carolyn Knapp and Celina Bhandari from 1824. It was released on June 11, 2021, the day with the release of the album.

Other official videos
On September 25, 2019, another music video for the song titled "Made with Memories", was released exclusively on Apple Music. It shows a montage of photos with the young Levine and his family, as well as him with his friends are the members of the band and they performed on touring in the world with various concerts.

The band released a cover tribute video on December 29, 2019. This video contains more than 57 videos on YouTube, some are the song's cover versions and was performed by fans from around the world including artists: Allie Sherlock, Connor Ball (of the Vamps), J.Fla, Davina Michelle and Boyce Avenue.

Live performances
On October 6, 2019, Maroon 5 performed "Memories" for the first time on The Ellen DeGeneres Show, which aired on October 7. The following day, band members Levine and Valentine performed an acoustic version of the song on The Howard Stern Show. In December 2019, the band played the song on Red Pill Blues Tour, during the last shows in Doha and Las Vegas. On February 1, 2020, Maroon 5 performed the song at the Bud Light Super Bowl Music Fest, a pre-show for Super Bowl LIV in Miami and made a tribute to Kobe Bryant, with his daughter Gianna and seven other victims of the Calabasas helicopter crash. During the COVID-19 pandemic, the band performed in isolation with a remote version of the song for the at home edition of The Tonight Show Starring Jimmy Fallon on May 12, 2020, with Levine dedicated to Bryant.

In June 2021, Maroon 5 played the song on Today, to promote the album Jordi. In September 2021, the band performed "Memories" at BB&T Pavilion in Camden, New Jersey for the CNN television special Shine a Light: A Tribute to the Families of 9/11, to commemorate with the 20th anniversary of September 11 attacks in New York City.

Awards and nominations

Track listing

Digital download
"Memories" – 3:09

Digital download – Dillon Francis Remix
"Memories" (Dillon Francis Remix) – 2:44

Digital download – Devault Remix
"Memories" (Devault Remix) – 3:13

Digital download – Cut Copy Remix
"Memories" (Cut Copy Remix) – 6:57

Charts

Weekly charts

Year-end charts

Certifications

Release history

See also
 List of number-one songs of 2019 (Malaysia)
 List of number-one singles of 2020 (Poland)
 List of number-one songs of 2019 (Singapore)
 List of Billboard Adult Contemporary number ones of 2020

References

2019 singles
2019 songs
2010s ballads
Maroon 5 songs
222 Records singles
Interscope Records singles
Number-one singles in Malaysia
Number-one singles in Poland
Number-one singles in Singapore
Songs written by Adam Levine
Songs written by Jacob Kasher
Songs written by Jon Bellion
Songs written by Stefan Johnson
Song recordings produced by the Monsters & Strangerz
Music videos directed by David Dobkin
Songs written by Michael Pollack (musician)
Animated music videos
Popular songs based on classical music